Charles Townshend, 2nd Viscount Townshend, was appointed Secretary of State for the Northern Department by George I of Great Britain in September 1714. He was the de facto leader of this Whig administration as Northern Secretary until 1717, when he was demoted to Lord Lieutenant of Ireland in favour of the first Stanhope–Sunderland ministry, after being outmanoeuvered by his rival Whigs. This Whig Split would last until 1720.

The Cabinet

Robert Walpole served as both First Lord of the Treasury and Chancellor of the Exchequer between 1715 and 1717.
While serving as Lord Lieutenant of Ireland (1714–1717), Lord Sunderland additionally served as Lord Privy Seal between 1715 and 1716.

See also
5th Parliament of Great Britain

References
 

British ministries
Government
1714 establishments in Great Britain
1717 disestablishments in Great Britain
1710s in Great Britain
Ministries of George I of Great Britain